Marcus Harris (born October 11, 1974) is a former American college football player who was an All-American wide receiver for the University of Wyoming and won the Fred Biletnikoff Award as the best college wide receiver in the nation.

Early life
Harris was born in 1974.  He attended Brooklyn Center High School in Brooklyn Center, Minnesota, where he was a star running back for the Brooklyn Center Centaurs high school football team.

College career
Harris received an athletic scholarship to attend the University of Wyoming, and he played for the Wyoming Cowboys football team from 1993 to 1996.  As a senior in 1996, Harris was recognized as a consensus first-team All-American and won the Biletnikoff Award.  He finished his career at Wyoming with 259 receptions, 4,518 receiving yards, and 38 touchdown catches.  He was inducted into the Wyoming Athletics Hall of Fame on September 24, 2004.

Statistics
Source:

Professional career
He was drafted by the Detroit Lions in the seventh round (232nd overall pick) of the 1997 NFL Draft.  He is the only Biletnikoff Award winner to never play in a National Football League (NFL) regular season game.

He currently is an offensive coordinator for the football team, assistant coach for boys basketball team and head coach of the girls softball team at the Breck School.

See also 
 List of NCAA major college football yearly receiving leaders

References

1974 births
Living people
All-American college football players
American football wide receivers
Detroit Lions players
Players of American football from Minneapolis
Wyoming Cowboys football players